Neil George Nicholson (born 17 October 1963, Whitby, North Yorkshire, England) is an English former first-class cricketer, who played five games for Yorkshire County Cricket Club in 1988 and 1989, when he also played in two one day games.  He scored a total of 134 first-class runs at 26.80, with a best of 56 not out, and he also took five catches.  Nicholson failed to take a wicket in five overs of medium pace.

He appeared for the Yorkshire Second XI from 1983 to 1990.

References

External links
Cricinfo Profile
Cricket Archive Statistics

1963 births
Yorkshire cricketers
People from Whitby
Living people
English cricketers
Cricketers from Yorkshire